Jorge Tanuscio (born 24 March 1947) is an Argentine field hockey player. He competed in the men's tournament at the 1968 Summer Olympics.

References

External links
 

1947 births
Living people
Argentine male field hockey players
Olympic field hockey players of Argentina
Field hockey players at the 1968 Summer Olympics
Field hockey players from Buenos Aires